This is a compilation of Sparta Prague women's team's results in official international competitions. As of the 2016-17 season, Sparta has taken part in thirteen editions of the UEFA Women's Cup and UEFA Women's Champions League, including the inaugural edition of the tournament.

Overall Record

2001-02 UEFA Women's Cup

First stage

2002-03 UEFA Women's Cup

First stage

2005-06 UEFA Women's Cup

Preliminary stage

First stage

Quarter-finals

2006-07 UEFA Women's Cup

First stage

2007-08 UEFA Women's Cup

Preliminary stage

First stage

2008-09 UEFA Women's Cup

Preliminary stage

2009-10 UEFA Women's Champions League

Round of 32

Round of 16

2010-11 UEFA Women's Champions League

Round of 32

Round of 16

2011-12 UEFA Women's Champions League

Round of 32

Round of 16

2012-13 UEFA Women's Champions League

Round of 32

Round of 16

2013-14 UEFA Women's Champions League

Round of 32

2014-15 UEFA Women's Champions League

Round of 32

2016-17 UEFA Women's Champions League

Round of 32

2017-18 UEFA Women's Champions League

Round of 32

Round of 16

2018-19 UEFA Women's Champions League

Round of 32

2019-20 UEFA Women's Champions League

Round of 32

2020-21 UEFA Women's Champions League

Round of 32

Round of 16

2021-22 UEFA Women's Champions League

Round 2

2022-23 UEFA Women's Champions League

Round 2

References

European football
Sparta Prague